Assignment Redhead (released in the US as Million Dollar Manhunt) is a 1956 British crime thriller film written and directed by Maclean Rogers. It is based on the novel Requiem for a Redhead by Lindsay Hardy.
The UK title of this film refers to the accordion-playing character central to the plot, Hedy Bergner, but as the movie is shot in black and white that is the only clue to the fact that she is supposed to be a redhead!

This film was also released as a radio serial 104 episodes, which was produced in Australia by Grace Gibson Radio Productions.

Premise
A murderous international master criminal (played by Ronald Adam), who specialises in providing false travel documents, seeks to get his hands on a hoard of counterfeit cash.

Cast 
 Richard Denning as Major Gregory Keen 
 Carole Mathews as Hedy Bergner 
 Ronald Adam as Major Scammel / Dumetrius 
 Danny Green as Yotti Blum 
 Brian Worth as Captain Peter Ridgeway 
 Jan Holden as Sally Jennings 
 Hugh Moxey as Sergeant Tom Coutts 
 Peter Swanwick as Monsieur Paul Bonnet 
 Elwyn Brook-Jones as Digby Mitchel 
 Ronald Leigh-Hunt as Colonel Julian Fentriss, M.I.5.
 Robert O'Neil as Captain Hank Godowski  
 Paul Hardtmuth as Dr. Buchmann  
 Bill Nagy as Marzotti  
 Alex Gallier as Max Rubenstein  
 Robert Bruce as Staff Officer 
 George Holdcroft as Nightclub Diner

Production
The film was the first of seven made by Richard Gordon's Amalgamated Productions. It was a co-production with Butcher's Film Distributors.

The film was made for under £15,000 plus the salaries and expenses of the American participants.

References

External links
 

1956 films
British crime thriller films
Films directed by Maclean Rogers
Films based on Australian novels
1950s crime thriller films
1950s English-language films
1950s British films
British black-and-white films